Arena Hash was a Peruvian rock band. The band originated from the early "Paranoia", a band formed at Maria Reina School, a Peruvian school in 1984. Arena Hash became famous in 1988 with their local hit "Cuando La Cama Me Da Vueltas".

Members
These are all the members of Arena Hash.
 Pedro Suárez-Vértiz (vocals, guitar)
 Patricio Suárez-Vértiz (bass)
 Christian Meier (keyboards)
 Arturo Pomar Jr. (drums).
 Edward Málaga-Trillo (early support on keyboards and back vocals).

Discography

Albums
 Arena Hash (1987)
 Ah Ah Ah (1991)
 Del Archivo...De Arena Hash (compilation) (1995)

Singles
 Difamación (1986)
 El Kangrejo (1987)
 Cuando La Cama Me Da Vueltas (1988)
 Me Resfrié En Brasil (1988)
 Stress (1988)
 Materialismo Sexual (1990)
 El Rey Del Ah Ah Ah (1991)
 Y Es Que Sucede Así (1991)
 ¿Cómo te va Mi Amor? (1991)
 A ese Infierno no voy a Volver (1991)

References

External links
 Listen to Arena Hash on Spotify

Peruvian musical groups